Hymanson is a surname. Notable people with the surname include:

Jeffrey Hymanson (born 1954), American ice hockey player
Patricia Hymanson, American physician and politician